Chancellery is the office of the chancellor, sometimes also referred to as the chancery.

Both terms may also refer to:

Government
 Chancellery (medieval office) or chancery, a medieval writing office
 Chancellery of the President of the Republic of Poland
 Chancellery of the Prime Minister of Poland
 Department of Chancellery, one of the three central government departments in imperial China between the 3rd and 13th centuries
 Federal Chancellery (Austria)
 Presidential Chancellery (Austria)
 Federal Chancellery of Switzerland
 Federal Public Service Chancellery of the Prime Minister, the office and department of the Prime Minister of Belgium
 Garde des Sceaux, i.e., keeper of the seals, or Chancellory, the  French Ministry of Justice
 German Chancellery, the office and department of the Chancellor of Germany
 Federal Chancellery (Bonn)
 Federal Chancellery (Berlin)
 His Imperial Majesty's Own Chancellery, an office in the 19th century Russian Empire, known for its secret department:
Third Section of His Imperial Majesty's Own Chancellery
 Hitler's Chancellery (Kanzlei des Führers), the personal chancellery of Adolf Hitler responsible for Hitler's personal affairs and requests made to Hitler directly.
 Nazi Party Chancellery, an office of Nazi Germany in the 20th century
 Reich Chancellery, the building in Berlin housing the Chancellor of Germany and other administrative offices of Germany during the German Empire, Weimar Republic and Nazi periods
 Royal Chancellery of the Polish–Lithuanian Commonwealth from the 16th to 18th centuries

Other uses
 Chancellory of Scotland, abolished in 1928
 Chancellery, a type of grappling hold also referred to as a headlock
 Chancellery of Honours, an office in the Canadian Heraldic Authority, part of the Canadian honours system

See also
 Chancery (disambiguation)